Irepodun may refer to :

Irepodun, Kwara, a Local Government Area in Kwara, Nigeria
Irepodun, Osun, a Local Government Area in Osun State, Nigeria
Irepodun/Ifelodun, a Local Government Area of Ekiti State, Nigeria